Alhambra Love Songs is an album composed by John Zorn which features eleven compositions performed by Rob Burger, Greg Cohen and Ben Perowsky. It includes musical tributes to Vince Guaraldi, Clint Eastwood, David Lynch, Mike Patton and Harry Smith.

Reception

The Allmusic review by Thom Jurek describes it as "an eclectic homage of sorts to the San Francisco Bay area and the musicians who have and continue to make it their home". The North Coast Journal stated "Alhambra Love Songs is yet another John Zorn record executed with grace, musical excellence, a sense of play and intensity. And, oddly, it just may be one of the great summer records of this year". Writing in Record Collector, reviewer Spencer Grady noted "This set captures a group in total togetherness, both with each other and also the wishes of their composer. In a decidedly vast and varied canon, Alhambra Love Songs may just prove to be one of John Zorn’s most rewarding and enduring works".

Track listing 
All compositions by John Zorn
 "Mountain View" – 5:08  
 "Novato" – 3:52  
 "Pacifica" – 3:58  
 "Benicia" – 3:48  
 "Half Moon Bay" – 4:38  
 "Moraga" – 4:17  
 "Tamalpais" – 4:08  
 "Larkspur" – 3:36  
 "Alhambra Blues" – 4:26  
 "Miramar" – 1:19  
 "Tiburon" – 5:19

Personnel 
 Rob Burger: piano 
 Greg Cohen: bass, electric bass
 Ben Perowsky: drums

References 

2009 albums
John Zorn albums
Albums produced by John Zorn
Tzadik Records albums